The Roberts Building in Great Falls, Montana, also known as Elmore Hotel, was built in 1917.  It was listed on the National Register of Historic Places in 1985.

It is notable for its association with William Roberts, who was important in the development of downtown Great Falls during 1886–1926.

References

Commercial buildings on the National Register of Historic Places in Montana
Buildings and structures in Great Falls, Montana
Hotel buildings on the National Register of Historic Places in Montana
National Register of Historic Places in Cascade County, Montana
1917 establishments in Montana